Haunt is a horror-themed adventure game developed by NanaOn-Sha and Zoë Mode, and published by Microsoft Studios. It was made available for download worldwide on the Xbox 360 via Xbox Live Arcade on January 18, 2012. The game requires the Kinect peripheral.

Gameplay
Haunt is played using the Kinect peripheral. Players use their body to control gameplay. One hand is used to control the on-screen flashlight, while other motions do things such as opening sarcophagi and doors. Emphasis on the player's entire body is used. For example, the player must cover their ears to avoid the loud scream of a banshee. Some sections of the game are automatically navigated, while in others players are free to roam the environment.

Development
Haunt was conceived by Masaya Matsuura. It was revealed at the Tokyo Game Show 2010. The game was designed to be child friendly rather than be a horror-focused title. British development team Zoë Mode created the majority of the game including programming, artwork and design with NanaOn-Sha overseeing the project. The game was originally planned for a 2011 release, but was delayed until 2012. Tim Schafer is featured as the voice of Benjamin Muldoon, the mansion's owner and narrator in the game.

Reception
Haunt received generally mixed reviews, resulting in the aggregate scores of 74% on GameRankings and 70 out of 100 on Metacritic.

References

2012 video games
First-person adventure games
2010s horror video games
Kinect games
Microsoft games
NanaOn-Sha games
Single-player video games
Video games about ghosts
Video games developed in Japan
Video games developed in the United Kingdom
Xbox 360 games
Xbox 360 Live Arcade games
Xbox 360-only games
Zoë Mode games